Haddington railway station served the town of Haddington, Scotland. Services were provided by trains on the Haddington line.

History
The station was opened by the North British Railway in 1846. The line passed on to the London and North Eastern Railway in 1923 and finally the Scottish Region of British Railways on nationalisation in 1948. The station was closed to passengers in 1949 and to freight in 1968.

Future
The majority of the former branch line was acquired by East Lothian District Council in 1978 and converted into a railway walk and cycleway.  Local campaign group, RAGES (Rail Action Group East of Scotland) have long-term ambitions to reintroduce rail services to Haddington.

References

Sources
 
 
 

Disused railway stations in East Lothian
Railway stations in Great Britain opened in 1846
Railway stations in Great Britain closed in 1968
Former North British Railway stations
Railway stations in East Lothian
1846 establishments in Scotland
1968 disestablishments in Scotland
Haddington, East Lothian